Aalesunds Avis (The Ålesund Gazette) was a newspaper published in Ålesund, Norway from 1917 to 1958. The paper belonged to the Conservative Party. Publication was halted by the Nazis in 1942. The paper started being published again in 1947, and it appeared weekly until 1958, when it was discontinued.

List of editors
Gerhard Jynge 1917–1921
Carl Ulfsæt 1921–1924
Sigurd Woll 1924–1925
Øyvin Lange 1925–1929
S. Stenbro Jacobsen 1929–1939
Reidar Stavseth 1939–1940
Kjell Steinsvik 1940–1942
Einar S. Ellefsen 1947–1958

References

Defunct newspapers published in Norway
Norwegian-language newspapers
Mass media in Møre og Romsdal
Mass media in Ålesund
Publications established in 1917
Publications disestablished in 1958
Conservative Party (Norway) newspapers